is a railway station in Shintoku, Kamikawa District, Hokkaidō, Japan.
Its station number is K23.

Lines
Hokkaido Railway Company
Nemuro Main Line
Sekishō Line

Railway stations in Hokkaido Prefecture
Railway stations in Japan opened in 1907